This is a list of public art in Milwaukee, Wisconsin. Works are listed from oldest to newest.

The list contains only works of public art freely accessible outdoors, and not, for example, works inside museums that charge admission.  Most of the works are sculptures.

Artworks

Bibliography
 Outdoor Sculpture in Milwaukee: A Cultural and Historical Guidebook by Diane M. Buck and Virginia A. Palmer. Wisconsin Historical Society, 1995.

References

Milwaukee
 
Public art in Wisconsin
Public art in Milwaukee
Public art